The 1901 Haskell Indians football team was an American football team that represented the Haskell Indian Institute (now known as Haskell Indian Nations University) as an independent during the 1901 college football season. In its second season under head coach Alfred G. Ellick, Haskell compiled a 6–2 record and outscored opponents by a total of 165 to 58.  The team's victories included games against Kansas and Missouri; its losses were to Minnesota and Nebraska.

Archiquette was the team captain. At the end of the 1901 season, four Haskell players were named to the All-Kansas football team: Carl at center; Redwater at guard; Bain at tackle; and Achiquette at end. Haskell's backfield included Dugan, Fallis, and Oliver at halfback, Miguel at fullback, and Bent and Fallis at quarterback.

Haskell was one of three Native American schools in 1901 to field football teams that competed in college football.  The other two were Carlisle in Pennsylvania and Chilocco in the Oklahoma Territory.

Schedule

References

Haskell
Haskell Indian Nations Fighting Indians football seasons
Haskell Indians football